Matthew Pratt (September 23, 1734 – January 9, 1805) was an American "Colonial Era" artist famous for his portraits of American men and women.  He was born in Philadelphia, Province of Pennsylvania to goldsmith Henry Pratt, (1708–1748) and Rebecca Claypoole, (1711–1762) (sister of James Claypoole Sr.), he was the second of eight children born to the Pratts.

Apprenticeship
He was apprenticed to his uncle, artist James Claypoole (a limner and painter) from 1745 to 1755.  He learned different aspects of portrait painting (including business acumen) from Claypoole.  In 1764 he escorted his cousin, Betsey Shewell to England for her marriage to the American "expatriate" artist Benjamin West.  West was gaining a distinguished reputation in England.  Pratt stayed on in England for two and a half years as a pupil and colleague to West.  It was during this time that he painted one of his best known works "The American School".

Back in America
In March 1768 he returned to America. Charles Willson Peale stated that at that time Matthew Pratt had a full-length portrait of John Dickinson and a considerable number of other works in progress.   It was there that he met John Singleton Copley.

Marriage and children
In 1760 he married Elizabeth Moore, (May 4, 1739 – July 7, 1777).
 Their children were:
 Henry Charles Pratt (May 14, 1761 – 1838);
 Charles Pratt, (September 10, 1763 – August 27, 1764);
 Charles Pratt, (February 18, 1769 – August 13, 1770);
 Mary Pratt, (July 20, 1771-?);
 Thomas Phyle Pratt, (October 1, 1773 – April 12, 1869); and,
 Elizabeth "Eliza" (née Pratt) Kugler, (August 2, 1776-?).

Later life
Pratt  announced that he was recently returned from England and Ireland and also New York.  He died in Philadelphia, Pennsylvania on January 9, 1805, and is buried in Christ Church Burial Ground. (An old historic burial ground established in 1695)

Oil paintings – portraits

 The American School – (1765) oil on canvas 36" x 50 1/4"  this painting depicts a group of five artists/painters in the London studio of artist Benjamin West at the Metropolitan Museum of Art
 Mrs. Elias Boudinot – (1740–1821) oil on canvas
 Cadwallader Colden and His Grandson Warren De Lancey – (1772) oil on canvas 50" x 40" at the Metropolitan Museum of Art
 Reynold Keen (1769) oil on canvas 30" x 25" at the Metropolitan Museum of Art
 Mrs. Peter De Lancey (1771) oil on canvas 29 3/4" x 25" at the Metropolitan Museum of Art
 Christiana Stille Keen (1769) oil on canvas 30" x 25" at the Metropolitan Museum of Art
 Abigail Willing
 Madonna of Saint Jerome (1764) oil on canvas 30 9/16" x 23 9/16" at the National Gallery of Art
 William Henry Cavendish-Bentinck, 3rd Duke of Portland (1774) oil on canvas 30 1/6" x 24 7/8" at the National Gallery of Art
 Benjamin West (1765) oil on canvas at the Pennsylvania Academy of Fine Arts
 Mrs. Benjamin West (1765) oil on canvas at the Pennsylvania Academy of Fine Arts
 James McCulloch (1773) oil on canvas at Princeton University Art Museum
 Mrs. John Langdale (née Alice Coates) (1760) oil on canvas at the Yale University Art Gallery
 Hugh McCullough (1773) oil on canvas 50 1/8" x 40 1/16"
 Benjamin Nicholson (1772) oil on canvas 29 5/8" x 24 3/4" owned by the New York Historical Society
 Captain John Barry (1776) oil on canvas 29 3/4" x 25" at University of Rochester Memorial Art Gallery
 Dr. William Bryant (1770) oil on canvas
 Vincent Loockerman oil on canvas
 Mrs. James Van Rensselaer (née Catherine Van Cortlandt) oil on canvas
 Elizabeth Willing Powel (1800) oil on canvas
 John Swanwick (1780) oil on canvas

Miniature portraits
 T. Matthew Pratt (1790) watercolor on ivory 2 9/16" x 2 1/16" at the Metropolitan Museum of Art
 Mrs. William Williamson (née Elizabeth Ann Timothy) (1775) watercolor and gouache on ivory 1 7/16" x 1 3/16" at the Metropolitan Museum of Art
 Mrs. Clark (1770) watercolor on ivory 1 5/8" x 1 5/16" at the Metropolitan Museum of Art

Museums and public galleries

The following galleries have works by Matthew Pratt:
 The Metropolitan Museum of Art
 The National Gallery of Art
 Memorial Art Gallery of the University of Rochester
 National Portrait Gallery Washington D.C.
 Pennsylvania Academy of the Fine Arts
 Princeton University Art Museum

References

1734 births
1805 deaths
Artists from Philadelphia
People of colonial Pennsylvania
18th-century American painters
18th-century American male artists
American male painters
19th-century American painters
19th-century American male artists
American portrait painters
Burials at Christ Church, Philadelphia